School District 8 Kootenay Lake is a school district in British Columbia. This includes the major centres of Nelson, Creston and Kaslo.

History
School District No. 8 (Kootenay Lake) was created with the amalgamation of School District No. 86 (Creston-Kaslo) and School District No. 7 (Nelson).

In 2016 the district board considered closing Creston Education Centre, Jewett Elementary School, Salmo Elementary School, Trafalgar Middle School, Winlaw Elementary School, and Yahk Elementary School. The district voted to keep Jewett and Winlaw open for now while the others were to be closed.

Schools

See also
List of school districts in British Columbia

References

External links
 School District 8 Kootenay Lake

Kootenays
08
Nelson, British Columbia